Bortolotti is an Italian surname. Notable people with the surname include:

 Alfonso Bortolotti (1911–2005), Italian sculptor
 Cesare Bortolotti (1950–1990), Italian entrepeuner
 Enea Bortolotti (1896–1942), Italian mathematician
 Ettore Bortolotti (1866–1947), Italian mathematician
 Gianfranco Bortolotti (born 1959), Italian producer and manager of Media Records and Media Studio
 Laura Bortolotti (born 1960), Italian former swimmer
 Linda Bortolotti (born 1995), Italian former long track speed skater
 Lisa Bortolotti (born 1974), Italian philosopher
 Marco Bortolotti (born 1991), Italian tennis player
 Maurizio Bortolotti (born 1961), Italian art critic, curator and researcher 
 Mirko Bortolotti (born 1990), Italian racing driver
 Simona Bortolotti (born 1994), Italian professional racing cyclist
 Timo Bortolotti (1889–1951), Italian sculptor

Italian-language surnames
Surnames of South Tyrolean origin